World News Today is a current affairs news programme, produced by BBC News presented on Friday-Sundays with Philippa Thomas, Karin Giannone & Kasia Madera. Presenters alternate the weekend shifts. It was originally conceived as a morning television show aimed at American audiences, hosted by George Alagiah, but later expanded to six editions a day aimed at different markets. There is now one daily edition only, aimed as an evening news programme for the UK, Europe, Middle East and Africa part-simulcast on BBC Four, BBC News Channel and BBC World News.

History
The programme originally used the same graphics and music as BBC World, though when The World on BBC Four was renamed World News Today, all editions were given a separate set of graphics and music with three being simulcast in the UK (03:00, 12:00, 19:00). Since April 2008 the standard title sequence used by the BBC's English Regions has been used, with some graphical alterations and with international images included. The first 30 mins of each broadcast are still simulcast on BBC Four.

As part of a channel refresh on BBC World News, five editions of World News Today were replaced on 1 February 2010 with GMT, Impact Asia now Impact, The Hub (later replaced with Global in 2013), Business Edition (later replaced by Outside Source and World News Today but returned replacing an edition of World News Today under the name Business Live), and a standard edition of BBC World News (replaced by Outside Source in 2014).

2015 changes

On 5 June 2015, a new edition was launched on the BBC News Channel and BBC World News at 21:00 BST (summer) or GMT (winter) on Friday–Sunday. Half an hour was dropped in November for the return of Business Edition. This replaced the BBC News at Nine and a standard edition of BBC World News on weekends.

2017 changes 
Since the inauguration of Donald Trump as US president, World News Today has not been broadcast on Monday to Thursdays. Additionally, beginning at the end of April, World News Today was off air for a number of weeks, a change which was originally meant to be permanent but was later reversed, meaning that World News Today continues to be broadcast at 7 pm UK time on Fridays and at 9 pm UK time Friday-Sunday.

However, the 17 July schedules show that World News Today would return to the Monday-Thursday at 18GMT (19:00 BST) on BBC Four and BBC World News. Katty Kay and Christian Fraser announced on 100 Days+ that the programme would end on the Thursday.

Between 22 December and 1 January Beyond 100 Days and Outside Source were both replaced with an edition of World News Today at 7 pm on BBC World News and at 9 pm on the BBC News Channel. On 1 December PBS America announced that the US network has acquired the rights to simulcast World News Today starting from 1 January.

2019 changes 
From 15 July 2019, BBC News and World News were integrated into the BBC's custom font (BBC Reith) and World News Today was given a BBC Reith update. It was first seen at 12 pm on BBC World News and BBC News.

Presenters
The remaining original edition shown on BBC Four and BBC World News is presented by:

When Badawi presented, the title sequence stated World News Today with Zeinab Badawi. However, when she did not, as she was often on assignment, the titles only showed World News Today, regardless of who the relief presenter actually was. This only happened if she was not reporting from a location on a topic covered in the programme.

Thomas, Giannone and Madera still present from different parts of the world. Giannone presented from South Africa in December 2013 following the death of Nelson Mandela and during live coverage from the trial of Oscar Pistorius in Pretoria. Madera presented from Poland during the 2015 Polish parliamentary election. Thomas, Sharma, presented from Washington in October / November 2016 for the 2016 US presidential election.

Guest presenters

The list below refers to people who have occasionally presented on an ad hoc basis:
2015, 2017 Sharanjit Leyl
2015, 2017 Rajini Vaidyanathan
2016–2017 Jane O'Brien 
2016 Clive Myrie
200?–2015 Martine Croxall

Former presenters

References

External links
 (BBC World News)
World News Today with Zeinab Badawi (BBC World News, 2013-October 2014)
World News Today (BBC Four)

BBC television news shows
BBC World News shows
British television news shows